Gangara is an Indomalayan  genus of grass skippers in the family Hesperiidae.

Species
Gangara lebadea (Hewitson, 1886) - banded redeye
Gangara thyrsis (Fabricius, 1775) - giant redeye
Gangara sanguinocculus  (Martin, 1895)Burma, Thailand, Malaysia, Borneo, Sumatra
Gangara tumpa  de Jong, 1992 Celebes
The larvae feed on Arecaceae, Musaceae, Philydraceae, Myrtaceae, Poaceae:- Calamus, Korthalsia, Arenga, Caryota, Cocos, Cyrtostachys, Elaeis, Eugeissona, Licuala, Livistona, Musa, Nypa, Philydrum, Psidium, Roystonea, Saccharum, Trachycarpus.

References

Natural History Museum Lepidoptera genus database

Hesperiinae
Hesperiidae genera